Qarajeh Qaya (also Romanized as Qarājeh Qayā and Qarejeh Qayā; also known as Gharājeh Ghiya, Qarājeh Qayah, Qarājeh Qayeh, Qarehjeh Qīā, and Qarajenkiah) is a village in Owch Tappeh-ye Sharqi Rural District, in the Central District of Meyaneh County, East Azerbaijan Province, Iran. At the 2006 census, its population was 112, in 25 families.

References 

Populated places in Meyaneh County